Men's Downhill World Cup 1983/1984

Calendar

Final point standings

In Men's Downhill World Cup 1983/84 the best 5 results count. Deduction are given in brackets.

References
 fis-ski.com

External links
 

World Cup
FIS Alpine Ski World Cup men's downhill discipline titles